Michael McElroy is the name of:

Michael McElroy (actor) (born 1967), musical theatre actor
Michael McElroy (scientist) (born 1939), atmospheric scientist